Purpurcapsula bayeri is a species of small sea snail, a marine gastropod mollusk in the family Triviidae, the false cowries or trivias.

Distribution
This marine species occurs off the Marquesas Islands.

References

 Fehse D. (1998) Beiträge zur Kenntnis der Triviidae (Mollusca: Gastropoda) I. Die Gatting Trivirostra von Western Samoa. Club Conchylia Informationen 30(4-6): 39-67.
 Fehse D. & Grego J. (2009) Contributions to the knowledge of the Triviidae (Mollusca: Gastropoda). X. The Triviidae from the Red Sea with a description of a new genus Purpurcapsula and a new species in the genus Trivirostra Jousseaume, 1884. Visaya 2(5): 18-79, pls. 1-13.
Contributions to the knowledge of Triviidae, 29-F. New Triviidae from the Marquesas. Visaya 5: 113-130, sér. Suppl

Triviidae
Gastropods described in 1998